is the 16th studio album by Japanese singer-songwriter Miyuki Nakajima, released in November 1988.

The album includes "Namida", her own rendition of a song Nakajima originally wrote for Kiyoshi Maekawa. The song released as a single before the album came out was the first material which was co-produced by Ichizo Seo, who has been her long-term collaborator since then.

The album debuted at number one on the Oricon Chart.

Track listing
All songs written by Miyuki Nakajima.
"" – 4:22
"" – 4:40
"Megami" – 4:53
"" – 4:59
"" – 3:59
"" – 4:10
"" – 6:10
" -Made in Tears" – 5:08
"" – 6:33

Personnel 
 Miyuki Nakajima – Lead and backing vocals
 Ichizo Seo – keyboards, backing vocals, computer programming
 Tsuyoshi Kon – electric guitar
 Hideo Saitō – electric guitar
 Chuei Yoshikawa – acoustic guitar
 Chiharu Mikuzuki – bass guitar
 Kenji Takamizu – bass guitar
 Yasuo Tomikura – bass guitar
 Nobuo Kurata – keyboards
 Yasuharu Nakanishi – keyboards
 Ken Shima – keyboards
 Elton Nagata – keyboards
 Tatsuhiko Mori – computer programming
 Keishi Urata – computer programming
 Nobuhiko Nakayama- computer programming
 Toshihiko Furumura – tenor sax
 Kazuyo Sugimoto – backing vocals
 Jun Aoyama – drums
 Hideo Yamaki – drums
 Toru Hasebe – drums
 Fairlight CMI, TR-707 – programming drums
 Tomota Group – strings
 Masatsugu Shinozaki – electric violin

Chart positions

References 

Miyuki Nakajima albums
1988 albums
Pony Canyon albums